Regiunea Stalin (Stalin Region) was one of the administrative divisions of the People's Republic of Romania. It was established in 1950, in the Soviet style of territorial organization, and was named after Joseph Stalin. Its name was changed to Brașov Region in 1960, and it was disestablished in 1968.

History

In 1950, the capital of the region was Orașul Stalin (Stalin City, now Brașov) and its territory comprised an area similar to what are nowadays the eastern part of Brașov County, together with Covasna County and part of Harghita County. Initially, the Stalin Region comprised 6 raions: Ciuc, Odorhei, Racoș, Sfântu Gheorghe, Stalin, and Târgu Secuiesc.

In 1952, the Ciuc, Odorhei, Sfântu Gheorghe, and Târgu Secuiesc raions were transferred to the newly established Magyar Autonomous Region, while the raions Sibiu, Făgăraș, Mediaș, Agnita, Sighișoara, and Târnăveni were included in the Stalin Region.

In 1960, the region was renamed Brașov Region, while the name of the capital city reverted to Brașov. Some areas in the Magyar Autonomous Region reverted to the Brașov Region, which after 1960 comprised the following raions: Agnita, Făgăraș, Mediaș, Rupea, Sfântu Gheorghe, Sibiu, Sighișoara, and Târgu Secuiesc.

Neighbors

From 1950 to 1956, Stalin Region had as neighbors:
North: .
From 1956 to 1960, Stalin Region had as neighbors: 
East: Magyar Autonomous Region. 
South:  and Pitești Region.
West: . 
North: Cluj Region.
From 1960 to 1968, Brașov Region had as neighbors:
South:  and Argeș Region. 
West: . 
North: Cluj Region and Mureș-Magyar Autonomous Region.

See also
Former administrative divisions of Romania
Regions of the People's Republic of Romania
List of places named after Joseph Stalin

References

Stalin